Ernest Clarke Williamson (24 May 1890 – 30 April 1964) was an English football goalkeeper.

Career 
Born in Murton, County Durham, Williamson began his career at local sides before moving to London in 1913 to join Croydon Common. During World War I he served in the Royal Army Service Corps and also turned out for various teams as a guest, including over 120 appearances for Arsenal. After the war ended, Williamson officially signed for Arsenal, who had just been promoted to the First Division, for a £150 fee. After sharing the keeper's jersey with Stephen Dunn in 1919–20 he made it his own the following season, playing 33 of the Gunners' 42 matches in 1920–21, and only missing one match the season after that.

His consistency for Arsenal brought the attention of the England selectors, and he became Arsenal's first post-First World War international, playing in both of England's matches away to Sweden on 21 May and 24 May 1923. However, by this time his Arsenal place was under threat; after conceding fourteen goals first in five matches during 1922–23 he had been dropped in favour of Dunn, and later Jock Robson. In June 1923 he left Arsenal for free to go to Norwich City. In all he played 113 official first-class matches for Arsenal, in addition to his unofficial wartime matches.

After playing for Division Three South Norwich for two seasons, Williamson retired from football altogether in 1925. He died in 1964, aged 73.

Career statistics

References

1890 births
1964 deaths
People from Murton, County Durham
Footballers from County Durham
English footballers
England international footballers
England wartime international footballers
Association football goalkeepers
Croydon Common F.C. players
Arsenal F.C. players
Norwich City F.C. players
English cricketers
Norfolk cricketers
British Army personnel of World War I
Middlesex Regiment soldiers
Royal Army Service Corps soldiers
Military personnel from County Durham